Michael Melford (born February 18, 1950, Gloversville, NY) is an American photographer, artist and teacher known for his National Geographic magazine assignments.

About
Michael Melford grew up in Hastings-on-Hudson, NY.  He has a BS in photography from Syracuse University.

Melford is known for his raw, natural landscapes and his ability to capture vibrant motion in nature.  He has produced over 30 stories for National Geographic Traveler magazine, including eight covers.  He has extensively photographed the marvels of America's National Parks and Alaska.  His inspirations are Ansel Adams and Ernst Haas.

Work
Melford's photographs have appeared in The Apple Store, Life Magazine, Newsweek, Time, Fortune, Smithsonian, Geo, Travel & Leisure, Travel Holiday, Coastal Living, National Geographic Traveler and National Geographic.

His image of Montana's Glacier National Park was featured on a U.S. Postage stamp, first issued January 19, 2012. Five of his photographs appeared as part of the "Wild and Scenic Rivers" Forever Stamps released in 2019 from the United States Postal Service. Melford's images were of the Merced River in California, the Idaho segment of the Owyhee River, the Koyukuk River in Alaska, the Niobrara River in Nebraska, and the Tlikakila River in Alaska. This stamp series celebrated the 50th anniversary of America's Wild and Scenic Rivers Act, signed into law in 1968.

Melford is a frequent workshop and seminar instructor for Visionary Wild, Lindblad Expeditions, and National Geographic Expeditions.

National Geographic works

Selected works

The Smithsonian Guide to Historic America:  The Mid-Atlantic States, 1989, Steward Tabori & Chang, with Michael S. Durham

Big Sky Country:  The Best of Montana, North Dakota, Wyoming, and Idaho, 1996, Rizzoli, 

National Geographic Destinations, Treasures of Alaska:  The Last Great American Wilderness, 2002, National Geographic, with Jeff Rennicke

Simply Beautiful Photographs, 2010, Focal Point (National Geographic),  (Cover Photo)

Visions of Earth, 2011, National Geographic, 

Hidden Alaska: Bristol Bay and Beyond, 2011, with Dave Atcheson

References

External links 
 Michael Melford's personal website
 Michael Melford's page at National Geographic
 Michael Melford's bio page at Visionary Wild
 Apple's use of Melford's photo

People from Hastings-on-Hudson, New York
1950 births
Living people
Syracuse University alumni
Photographers from New York (state)